The 80th parallel north is a circle of latitude that is 80 degrees north of the Earth's equatorial plane, and 10 degrees (690 miles / 1100 kilometers) south of the North Pole, in the Arctic. It crosses the Atlantic Ocean, Europe, Asia, the Arctic Ocean and North America.

At this latitude the sun is visible for 24 hours, 0 minutes during the summer solstice and astronomical twilight during the winter solstice.

This latitude is the boundary between the Arctic and High Arctic zones of Canada's National Topographic System, at which the longitude span of each map sheet doubles as one crosses this latitude going north.

Around the world
Starting at the Prime Meridian and heading eastwards, the parallel 80° north passes through:

{| class="wikitable plainrowheaders"
! scope="col" width="125" | Co-ordinates
! scope="col" | Country, territory or sea
! scope="col" | Notes
|-
| style="background:#b0e0e6;" | 
! scope="row" style="background:#b0e0e6;" | Atlantic Ocean
| style="background:#b0e0e6;" | Greenland Sea
|-
| 
! scope="row" | 
| Svalbard - island of Spitsbergen
|-
| style="background:#b0e0e6;" | 
! scope="row" style="background:#b0e0e6;" | Atlantic Ocean
| style="background:#b0e0e6;" | Hinlopen Strait
|-
| 
! scope="row" | 
| Svalbard - island of Nordaustlandet
|-valign="top"
| style="background:#b0e0e6;" | 
! scope="row" style="background:#b0e0e6;" | Barents Sea
| style="background:#b0e0e6;" | Passing just south of the islands of Storøya and Kvitøya, Svalbard,  Passing just south of Victoria Island, 
|-
| 
! scope="row" | 
| Franz Josef Land - Northbrook Island
|-
| style="background:#b0e0e6;" | 
! scope="row" style="background:#b0e0e6;" | Barents Sea
| style="background:#b0e0e6;" |
|-
| 
! scope="row" | 
| Franz Josef Land -  Salm Island
|-
| style="background:#b0e0e6;" | 
! scope="row" style="background:#b0e0e6;" | Barents Sea
| style="background:#b0e0e6;" |
|-
| style="background:#b0e0e6;" | 
! scope="row" style="background:#b0e0e6;" | Kara Sea
| style="background:#b0e0e6;" |
|-valign="top"
| 
! scope="row" | 
| Severnaya Zemlya - Pioneer Island and Matusevich Fjord, October Revolution Island
|-
| style="background:#b0e0e6;" | 
! scope="row" style="background:#b0e0e6;" | Laptev Sea
| style="background:#b0e0e6;" |
|-
| style="background:#b0e0e6;" | 
! scope="row" style="background:#b0e0e6;" | Arctic Ocean
| style="background:#b0e0e6;" |
|-
| 
! scope="row" | 
| Nunavut - Meighen Island
|-
| style="background:#b0e0e6;" | 
! scope="row" style="background:#b0e0e6;" | Sverdrup Channel
| style="background:#b0e0e6;" | 
|-
| 
! scope="row" | 
| Nunavut - Axel Heiberg Island
|-
| style="background:#b0e0e6;" | 
! scope="row" style="background:#b0e0e6;" | Eureka Sound
| style="background:#b0e0e6;" |
|-
| 
! scope="row" | 
| Nunavut - Fosheim Peninsula, Ellesmere Island
|-
| style="background:#b0e0e6;" | 
! scope="row" style="background:#b0e0e6;" | Cañon Fiord
| style="background:#b0e0e6;" |
|-
| 
! scope="row" | 
| Nunavut - Ellesmere Island
|-
| style="background:#b0e0e6;" | 
! scope="row" style="background:#b0e0e6;" | Nares Strait
| style="background:#b0e0e6;" |
|-
| 
! scope="row" | 
|Cape Clay
|-
| 
! scope="row" | 
|Hovgaard Island
|-
| style="background:#b0e0e6;" | 
! scope="row" style="background:#b0e0e6;" | Atlantic Ocean
| style="background:#b0e0e6;" | Greenland Sea
|-
|}

See also
79th parallel north
81st parallel north

n80
Geography of the Arctic